Eleazar (meaning "God has helped", el'azár) is a common Jewish given name for a male.

People with this name
The first male known to be given the name was Eleazar, son of Aaron and High Priest of Israel.

Other people with this name include:
Eleazar (son of Aminadab), who was entrusted as a keeper of the Ark of the covenant
Eleazar (son of Dodo), one of King David's warriors
Eleazar (son of Pinhas), one of those in charge of the sacred vessels brought back to Jerusalem after the Babylonian Exile
Eleazar Avaran, the younger brother of Judas Maccabeus
Eleazar (2 Maccabees), a Jewish martyr (2 Maccabees chapter 6)
Eleazar ben Ananus, Temple Captain in 66 CE who cancelled the sacrifices to Caesar
Eleazar ben Azariah, first century Mishanic scholar
Eleazar ben Arach, one of the Tannaim of the First century C.E. 
Eleazar ben Pedat, an Amoraim of the 4th Century C.E. 
Eleazar Davidman, Israeli tennis player
 Eleazar Lipsky, American lawyer, novelist, playwright, president of the Jewish Telegraphic Agency
Elazar Meisels, American Orthodox rabbi
Eleazar ben Shammua, a Mishnaic teacher of the 4th generation
Elazar Shach (1898–2001), rosh yeshiva of the Ponevezh yeshiva and founded the Degel HaTorah political party
Eleazar ben Simon, one of the leaders of Jewish resistance in the First Jewish-Roman War
Eleazar, name chosen by Bodo (bishop) upon conversion to Judaism
Eleazar Rodgers, South African football (soccer) player
Eleazar, son of Eliud, mentioned briefly in the genealogy of Jesus ( verse 15)
David Elazar (1925–1976), Chief of Staff of the Israel Defense Forces
Guillermo Eleazar, Chief of the Philippine National Police

See also
Eliezer
Lazar (name)
Lazarus (name)
Eleazar (disambiguation)

Jewish given names